The Co-Optimist Rugby Club is an invitational rugby union club founded in 1924 by Jock Wemyss, the former Scottish test player, together with George St Claire Murray, a rugby enthusiast from the Watsonians club.

The club also has a proud record at the Hong Kong Sevens tournament, finishing as runner-up to Fiji in 1980, as a semi-finalist against Australia in 1981, and a quarter-finalist in 1986.

Club colours and emblem
The club colours are a navy blue jersey with white shorts and navy and white hooped socks. The Co-Optimist badge is a lion couchant in blue on a white background.

Notable players

Many well-known international players have represented the club including: Finlay Calder, Jonathan Davies, Mike Gibson, Gavin Hastings, Scott Hastings, Andy Irvine, Dickie Jeeps, John Jeffrey, Tom Kiernan, Ian McGeechan, Doddie Weir, Tony O’Reilly and Rob Wainwright.

Partial list of games played against international opposition

XVs

Sevens

Honours

 Melrose Sevens
 Champions (1): 1993
 Langholm Sevens
 Champions (1): 1936
 Jed-Forest Sevens
 Champions (1): 1940
 Selkirk Sevens
 Champions (4): 1937, 1938, 1947, 1975
 Edinburgh Charity Sevens
 Champions (2): 1939, 1960
 Edinburgh Borderers Sevens
 Champions (1): 1925
 Glasgow High Kelvinside Sevens
 Champions (1): 1984

References

International rugby union teams
 
1924 establishments in Scotland
Rugby clubs established in 1924
Rugby sevens teams